The Mole is a 2011 Polish drama film directed by Rafael Lewandowski. The film premiered at the 2011 Gdynia Film Festival.

Cast 
 Borys Szyc as Pawel Kowal
 Marian Dziędziel as Zygmunt Kowal
 Magdalena Czerwińska as Ewa Kowal
 Wojciech Pszoniak as Stefan Grabek
 Bartłomiej Topa as Manager of 'Solidarity'
 Jerzy Janeczek as Rysiek

References

External links 

2011 drama films
2011 films
Polish drama films